This is a complete list of the operas of the Italian composer Ermanno Wolf-Ferrari (1876–1948).

List

References

Waterhouse, John C G (1992), "Wolf-Ferrari, Ermanno" in The New Grove Dictionary of Opera, ed. Stanley Sadie (London) 

 
Lists of operas by composer
Lists of compositions by composer